Soul Searching is the fourth album released by Average White Band.

Track listing
"Overture" (Average White Band, Ball, Stuart) - 2:14   	
"Love Your Life" (Average White Band, Gorrie, Stuart) - 4:49 	
"I'm the One" (Average White Band, Ball, Gorrie, Stuart) - 4:18 	
"A Love of Your Own" (Stuart, Ned Doheny) - 5:28 	
"Queen of My Soul" (Stuart) - 6:05 	
"Soul Searching" (Gorrie, Stuart) - 3:15 	
"Goin' Home" (Ball, Average White Band, Gorrie, Stuart) - 4:36 	
"Everybody's Darling" (Ball, Stuart) - 3:31 	
"Would You Stay" (Ball, Stuart) - 5:33 	
"Sunny Days" (Ferrone, Stuart, Gorrie) - 3:14 	
"Digging Deeper" (Average White Band, Ball, Gorrie) - 2:43

Personnel
Average White Band
Alan Gorrie – bass, guitar, lead and backing vocals
Hamish Stuart – bass, guitar, lead and backing vocals
Roger Ball – keyboards, alto saxophone, string arrangements, horn arrangements
Malcolm Duncan – tenor saxophone
Onnie McIntyre – guitar, backing vocals
Steve Ferrone – drums, percussion
with:
Michael Brecker – tenor saxophone
Randy Brecker – trumpet
Jim Mullen – guitar
Kenneth Bichel – synthesizer
Seymour Barab, Alan Schulman, Jesse Levy – cello
Carlos Martin – percussion, conga
Barry Rogers – trombone
Marvin Stamm – trumpet
Ronnie Cuber – baritone saxophone
David Brigati, Eddie Brigati – backing vocals

Charts

Singles

References

External links
 Average White Band-Soul Searching at Discogs

1976 albums
Average White Band albums
Albums produced by Arif Mardin
Atlantic Records albums